Dave Kalina (born September 2, 1947) is a former American football player who played two season with the Pittsburgh Steelers of the National Football League. He played college football at the University of Miami.

References

1947 births
Living people
American football wide receivers
Miami Hurricanes football players
Pittsburgh Steelers players
Players of American football from Pennsylvania
People from Braddock, Pennsylvania